THG Sports (The Hospitality Group) was a provider of sports ticketing services and corporate hospitality programmes at sporting events around the world  It has 69 offices globally and has around 3,000 employees who provide access to over 350 major events each year. It focuses primarily on: soccer, rugby, American football, athletics, horse racing, Formula One motor racing, and tennis.

The company was owned by the Marcus Evans group whose other sporting interests include ownership of Ipswich Town Football Club, English League champions in 1962.

History 
THG (The Hospitality group) was founded in 1983 as the division of the Marcus Evans Group whose goal it was to combine corporate hospitality with premier international sporting events. It has organised hospitality functions at distinguished events like the US Grand Prix, World Cup Soccer, Masters, US Open and the Final Four.

The company has steadily expanded; its core business diversifying into the provision of business intelligence through business conferences, summits, business training and the publication of comprehensive reports on strategic industry issues. In October 2000, the new corporate identity and image was announced as Marcus Evans.

Offices 
THG’s European headquarters are in London. Its North American headquarters are in Chicago, with offices in San Diego and Montreal.

London Olympics 2012 and Olympic tickets 
In 2010, The Olympic Council of Ireland (OCI) appointed THG as its official ticketing agent for the 2012 London Olympics and the 2014 Winter Olympics in Sochi.

In early 2011 following the announcement from the London Organising Committee of the Olympic and Paralympics Games (LOCOG), a division of THG – THG Sports Tours - was confirmed as Authorised Ticket Reseller (ATR) for three European Olympic Councils (Ireland, Greece and Malta) ahead of the London 2012 Olympic Games, taking place from 27 July to 12 August 2012 The company is one of several overseas official ticketing agencies which are currently in the spotlight due to a series of unfortunate incidents of fraudulent ticket touting on unauthorised websites.
 
Popular consumer watchdogs like the BBC's Moneybox programme  have been strongly advising people to only deal with official ticket agencies as listed on the main London Olympics 2012 website.

Football Association of Ireland (FAI)
Dublin’s Aviva Stadium on the site of the old Landsdowne Road Stadium was officially opened in May 2010 and is the venue for home matches for its main tenants, the Irish Rugby Union team and the Football Association of Ireland (FAI) team. THG is the sole hospitality provider for FAI games at the stadium.

Controversies

THG CEO James Sinton was investigated in relation to a 2014 FIFA World Cup ticket scam. Once granted bail, Sinton left Brazil and never returned to face justice. THG has been reported in the UK press as offering amazing open corporate hospitality packages for the 2012 Olympics costing up to nearly £10,000 a head despite Prestige Ticketing having paid £75 million for the official in–venue corporate entertaining rights. London Olympic Committee lawyers are apparently looking to see whether or not the company is coming close to abusing its status as an official ticket reseller.

Super Bowl
In 2011, THG celebrated its 20-year association with Super Bowl hospitality in Dallas, Texas.

See also
 Marcus Evans

References

External links
 

Companies based in Chicago
Entertainment companies established in 1983
Event management companies of the United States